Escape to Love is a film. It was shot in 1982 but not released until 1986.

References

External links
Escape to Love at IMDb

1986 films
1980s English-language films